Robert Garnett "Buddy" Blattner (February 8, 1920 – September 4, 2009) was an American table tennis and professional baseball player. He played five seasons in Major League Baseball (MLB), primarily for the New York Giants. After his retirement as a player, he became a radio and television sportscaster.

Sports career

Table tennis
Blattner played table tennis in his youth, winning the gold medal in the men's doubles with James McClure at the 1936 World Table Tennis Championships. The following year he won double gold at the 1937 World Table Tennis Championships in the men's team event and in the men's doubles with McClure.

Baseball
A graduate of Beaumont High School in St. Louis, Blattner started his Major League Baseball (MLB) career with the St. Louis Cardinals, making his big league debut in the 1942 season. Following a stint in the United States Navy, Blattner played for the New York Giants (1946–48) and Philadelphia Phillies (1949); he played primarily as a second baseman.

Broadcasting
Blattner turned to broadcasting after his retirement as a player, teaming with Dizzy Dean on St. Louis Browns radio as well as nationally on the Liberty and Mutual networks, and on the televised baseball Game of the Week on ABC (1953–54) and CBS (1955–59). He also called games for the St. Louis Hawks of the National Basketball Association in the '50s.

Blattner was replaced on CBS by Pee Wee Reese following a dispute with Dean. Blattner continued to broadcast baseball for the Cardinals (1960–61), Los Angeles/California Angels (1962–68), and Kansas City Royals (1969–75) as well as on NBC's coverage of the 1964 and 1967 All-Star Games.

Personal life
In 1962, Blattner founded the "Buddy Fund", a charitable organization that supplies athletic equipment to disabled and underprivileged children in the St. Louis area. He was inducted into the U.S. Table Tennis Association Hall of Fame in 1979, and the Missouri Sports Hall of Fame in 1980. On September 4, 2009, Blattner died at his home in Chesterfield, Missouri, from lung cancer, aged 89. In 2021 Baseball Hall of Fame balloting, Blattner was a finalist for the Ford C. Frick Award, presented annually by the National Baseball Hall of Fame.

See also
 List of World Table Tennis Championships medalists

References

Further reading
Buddy Blattner at SABR (Baseball BioProject)
Noland, Claire. "Buddy Blattner dies at 89; former major leaguer and longtime sportscaster", Los Angeles Times, Saturday, September 5, 2009.

External links
  

1920 births
2009 deaths
American male table tennis players
United States Navy personnel of World War II
American radio sports announcers
American television sports announcers
Baseball players from St. Louis
California Angels announcers
Deaths from lung cancer in Missouri
Kansas City Royals announcers
Major League Baseball broadcasters
Major League Baseball second basemen
National Basketball Association broadcasters
National Football League announcers
New York Giants (NL) players
Philadelphia Phillies players
St. Louis Browns announcers
St. Louis Cardinals announcers
St. Louis Cardinals players
St. Louis Cardinals (football) announcers
St. Louis Hawks announcers
20th-century American people